Paul Kruger (1825–1904) was State President of the South African Republic.

Paul Kruger may also refer to:
 Paul Krüger (jurist) (1840–1926), German jurist
 Paul Krüger (chess player) (1871–1939), German chess master
 Paul Kruger (American football) (born 1986), American football linebacker
 Paul Krüger (politician), German politician; Federal Minister for Education, Science, Research and Technology 1993–1994